John M. White House, also known as Springs Industries Guest House, is a historic home located at Fort Mill, York County, South Carolina. It was built about 1872, and is a two-story brick dwelling with Italianate and Second Empire style design elements.  It features a low-pitched, bracketed roof, a front verandah with decorative brackets, and a mansard roofed central pavilion.  Also on the property is a one-story brick cottage and carriage house / garage.

It was added to the National Register of Historic Places in 1985.

References

Houses on the National Register of Historic Places in South Carolina
Italianate architecture in South Carolina
Second Empire architecture in South Carolina
Houses completed in 1872
Houses in York County, South Carolina
National Register of Historic Places in York County, South Carolina